Le Temps (French for The Time) may refer to:

Le Temps, a Swiss newspaper
Le Temps (Paris), a former French newspaper (1861-1942)
Le Temps (1829), a former French newspaper (1829-1842)
Le Temps (Tunisia), a Tunisian newspaper founded in 1975
Le Temps (Ivory Coast), a newspaper in Côte d'Ivoire
Le Temps stratégique, a former Swiss bimonthly
Le Temps (Montreal), a former newspaper in Montreal, Quebec, founded in 1883